Stab is an unincorporated community in  Pulaski County, Kentucky, United States.

Description
A post office called Stab was established in 1922, and remained in operation until it was discontinued in 1994. The name Stab was chosen in part for its brevity; the first choice had been rejected as too long by postal authorities.

Stab is noted as the location of a karst window formation, Short Creek.

References

Unincorporated communities in Pulaski County, Kentucky
Unincorporated communities in Kentucky